Michael Bublé is the third studio album by Canadian singer Michael Bublé. It was released on 143 Records and Reprise Records. The album was released on February 11, 2003. The album spawned four singles: "How Can You Mend a Broken Heart", "Kissing a Fool", "Sway" and "Spider-Man Theme".

Background
Bublé's career breakthrough came when he performed Kurt Weill's classic track "Mack the Knife" at the wedding of Brian Mulroney's daughter Caroline in September 2000. Mulroney introduced Bublé to David Foster, a multi-Grammy awarding producer and a Warner Bros. Records executive, who had previously worked with the likes of Josh Groban. Foster signed Bublé to his 143 record label, and he started recording a self-titled album in 2001, with David Foster as producer. The album features a range of standards from various eras including "Fever", "The Way You Look Tonight", "For Once in My Life", Van Morrison's "Moondance" and Lou Rawls' "You'll Never Find Another Love Like Mine". Barry Gibb of the Bee Gees performs with Bublé on his version of the group's classic track, "How Can You Mend a Broken Heart".

Reception

The album was released on February 11, 2003, to worldwide commercial success. The album peaked at No. 8 on the Canadian Albums Chart, as well as peaking at No. 1 in Australia and New Zealand, and achieving 2× platinum status, and No. 47 on the Billboard 200. The album also peaked at No. 6 in the United Kingdom, achieving platinum status. The album was eventually certified 4× platinum in Canada during 2006, 2× Platinum in the United Kingdom during 2007, and 7× Platinum in Australia during 2007. Bublé also won the "Best New Talent" award at the Juno Awards of 2004, and the album itself was nominated for "Album of the Year", only losing out to Sam Roberts.

Singles
"How Can You Mend a Broken Heart", a cover of the original by the Bee Gees, was released as the album's lead single on February 4, 2003. The single was only released in the United States. It managed to reach the top thirty of the Billboard adult contemporary chart. No music video was released for the single.

"Kissing a Fool", a cover of the original by George Michael, was released as the album's second single on May 8, 2003, exclusively in the United States and Japan, also reaching the top thirty of the Billboard adult contemporary chart. No official music video was released for the single, despite strong radio airplay.

"Sway", originally performed by Dean Martin, was released as the album's third single on June 22, 2004. It also reached the top thirty of the adult contemporary chart, while a remix of the song by Junkie XL reached the top twenty in Australia in July 2004. "Moondance" was released alongside "Sway" in Australia.

"Spider-Man Theme" was released as the album's fourth and final single in certain territories, appearing on a special edition of the album released in Italy and other select areas of Europe. The single was most successful in Italy, peaking at No. 2 on the Italian Singles Chart.

Track listing

Personnel

Musicians 
 Michael Bublé – vocals
 Mike Melvoin – acoustic piano (1)
 Jochem van der Sagg – programming (1)
 Randy Waldman – acoustic piano (2, 4, 6, 8, 9, 10, 12, 13), keyboards (10)
 David Foster – acoustic piano (3, 5, 7, 11), bass (5), synth bass (8, 10), strings (10)
 Neil Devor – synthesizer programming (3, 5, 7, 8, 10)
 Felipe Elgueta – synthesizer programming (10)
 Michael Thompson – guitars (1), electric guitar (9)
 Dean Parks – guitars (2, 8), acoustic guitar (5, 9), electric guitar (5), percussion (10)
 John Pisano – guitars (6, 13)
 Heitor Pereira – guitars (7), acoustic guitar (11)
 Brian Bromberg – bass (1–4, 6, 7, 9, 11, 12, 13)
 Dave Tull – drums (1–4)
 Vinnie Colaiuta – drums (3, 5, 7, 8, 10, 11)
 Joe LaBarbera – drums (9, 12)
 Frank Capp – drums (6, 13)
 Rafael Padilla – percussion (1, 3, 5, 6, 7, 11)
 Bob Sheppard – saxophone solo (6)
 David Boruff – saxophones (12)
 Gary Grant – trumpet solo (2)
 Barry Gibb – backing vocals (5)
 Sherree Ford – vocals (7)

Arrangements
 David Foster – arrangements (1, 2, 3, 5, 7–11), string arrangements (1), horn arrangements (10)
 Bill Holman – arrangements (1)
 Chris Boardman – string arrangements (1)
 John Clayton – arrangements (2)
 Mike Melvoin – arrangements (3)
 Don Costa – arrangements (4)
 Johnny Mandel – arrangements (6, 13)
 William Ross – string arrangements (7, 9, 11)
 Michael Bublé – horn arrangements (8, 10)
 Don Sebesky – horn arrangements (8)
 Randy Waldman – arrangements (9), horn arrangements (10)
 Billy May – orchestrations (12)
 Sammy Nestico – re-orchestrations (12)

Production 
 David Foster – producer
 Humberto Gatica – producer, engineer, mixing 
 Johnny Mandel – producer (6, 13)
 Chris Brooke – assistant engineer 
 Neil Devor – assistant engineer (1–11, 13), additional Pro Tools engineer, engineer (12), production coordinator 
 Alejandro Rodriguez – assistant engineer (1–11, 13), engineer (12)
 Dave Reitzas – guitar engineer (2, 5, 8, 9), engineer (12)
 Nick Marshall – assistant guitar engineer (2, 5, 8, 9), assistant engineer (12)
 Jon Merchant – vocal recording (Barry Gibb's vocals on 5)
 Joe Wolmuth – Pro Tools mixing engineer 
 Kevin Guarnieri – additional Pro Tools engineer 
 Christian Robles – additional Pro Tools engineer 
 Vlado Meller – mastering 
 Greta Detrick – production assistant 
 Kathy Frangetis – production assistant
 Mick Haggerty – art direction, design, package photography 
 Stephen Danelian – cover photography, package photography 
 Zak Jenkinson – grooming

Studios
 Recorded and Mixed at Chartmaker Studios (Malibu, California).
 Barry Gibb vocals recorded at Middle Ear Studios (Miami, Florida).
 Orchestra recorded at Westlake Audio, Signet Sound Studios and Warner Bros. Recording Studios (Los Angeles, California); Paramount Recording Studios (Hollywood, California).
 Mastered at Sony Music Studios (New York City, New York).

Charts

Weekly charts

Year-end charts

Decade-end charts

Sales and certifications

References

143 Records albums
2003 albums
Albums produced by David Foster
Albums recorded at Westlake Recording Studios
Michael Bublé albums
Reprise Records albums